The Los Altos Apartments is a Mission Revival-style apartment building on Wilshire Boulevard in Los Angeles, California.

History
Los Altos was built in 1925 and designed by Edward B. Rust and Luther Mayo. In 1999, it was listed on the National Register of Historic Places.

When built, the Los Altos Apartments began as a co-op and were later used as a luxury apartment and hotel catering to stars like Clara Bow, Bette Davis, Mae West, Douglas Fairbanks, Ava Gardner, Judy Garland, and William Randolph Hearst. Hearst had a custom suite designed for his mistress Marion Davies in the Los Altos, which has been restored and named The Hearst Suite.

The Spanish Colonial-style building went bankrupt during the Great Depression and fell into disrepair. In 1993, a local housing group Neighborhood Effort rescued the structure from demolition and obtained national historic site status by tracking down its original parts and design details such as floor tiles, doorknobs, and colors.

In the 1980s the building became a magnet for a bohemian list of residents. Jeff Ayeroff, who went on to co-found Virgin Records America and the Work Group, lived in the building as did screenwriter Becky Johnston while she wrote the scripts "Under the Cherry Moon" for Prince and "The Prince of Tides" for Barbra Streisand.  Artists Nancy Reese, Phil Garner, Eric Blum and Tom Shannon all rented living quarters and art dealers Tom Jancar and  Richard Kuhlenschmidt opened the Jancar Kuhlenschmidt Gallery in the basement of the building. New York hotshots Richard Prince and Louise Lawler had their first L.A. exhibitions there. Actor Frederic Forrest was living at the Los Altos when he turned in his critically acclaimed performance in Francis Ford Coppola's 1988 film Tucker: The Man and His Dream, as did musician Tommy Gear, who was a founding member of revered L.A. punk group The Screamers.

Los Angeles-based architectural firm M2A rehabilitated the 75-unit structure, and restored its original decor. The firm restored or recreated Los Altos' original light fixtures, hardware, carpets, plaster work, awnings, and ornamental iron work. The rehabilitation "successfully transformed the property from a vacant, blighted, graffiti-infested building into a healthy, mixed-income building serving the very low income population as well as the market population." Today, Los Altos is the home to artists, screenwriters, and actors. In 1999, Los Altos received several preservation design awards from the California Preservation Foundation and the Los Angeles Conservancy. The landmark also received a Historic Preservation Award of Excellence from the city of Los Angeles.

Popular culture
The television series Angel prominently featured exterior shots of the Los Altos Apartments in seasons 2–4. It acted as the exterior of the Hyperion Hotel, the home and base of titular character and his friends. The Los Altos Apartments building was also featured in a season 1 episode of Angel titled "I Fall to Pieces", where it was used as both exterior and interior for the apartment building of a guest character.

In the fifth episode of the second season of the television series Numbers, titled "Assassin", the building was used as the exterior of the Rancho Verde Assisted Living building.

In the Amazon series Transparent, the character Ali lives in the Los Altos Apartments; several exteriors, including scenes in the courtyard entry, are featured in seasons 1 and 2.

In the Netflix limited series Brand New Cherry Flavor, main character Lisa Nova lives in the Los Altos Apartments, and the exteriors and sign are prominently featured throughout the series.

In Steven Paul Leiva's 2022 novel, The Reluctant Heterosexual: A Tragicomedy in Four Movements A Prelude and An Interlude, the Los Altos is the first home of the parents of the novel's protagonist, Robert Leslie Cromwell.

See also
 National Register of Historic Places listings in Los Angeles
 List of Los Angeles Historic-Cultural Monuments in the Wilshire and Westlake areas

Gallery

References

External links

Apartment buildings in Los Angeles
Los Angeles Historic-Cultural Monuments
Mid-Wilshire, Los Angeles
Wilshire Boulevard
Residential buildings completed in 1925
Residential buildings on the National Register of Historic Places in Los Angeles
Spanish Colonial Revival architecture in California